United Beit Jala was a joint list of Fatah and the Palestinian People's Party for the May 2005 municipal elections in Beit Jala, the West Bank. The list won six seats. The top candidate of the list was Raji George Jadallah Zeidan. One PPP member was elected, the rest belonging to Fatah.

References

Defunct political party alliances in the Palestinian territories
Fatah
Beit Jala